Battista Sforza (14466 or 7 July 1472) was the Duchess of Urbino in 1460-1472 as the second wife of Federico da Montefeltro. She acted as regent during her husband's absences from Urbino.

Biography
Battista was the first legitimate child born to Alessandro Sforza, lord of Pesaro, and  Costanza da Varano (14281447), the eldest daughter of Piergentile Varano (d. 1433), Lord of Camerino, and Elisabetta Malatesta. In 1447, Costanza died after giving birth to her second child, a son called Costanzo (d. 1483), when Battista was 18 months old. After the death of their mother Battista and Costanzo, together with their illegitimate half-sisters Ginevra (14401507) and Antonia (14451500), moved to the court of their paternal uncle Francesco Sforza and his wife Bianca Maria Visconti where they were brought up alongside their cousins.

Battista and her cousin Ippolita Maria received a humanist education and the former was fluent in Greek and Latin, giving her first Latin public speech at the age of four. She was said to be very skilled in Latin rhetoric and even gave an oration before Pope Pius II. The poet Giovanni Santi described Battista as "a maiden with every grace and virtue rare endowed".

Her uncle Francesco Sforza arranged for her marriage to Federico da Montefeltro, Duke of Urbino, who was twenty-four years older than her. The wedding took place on 8 February 1460, when Battista was fourteen years old. Their marriage was a happy one and they were described by a contemporary, Baldi, as "two souls in one body". Federico called Battista "the delight of both my public and my private hours." Moreover, he spoke with her about political issues and she accompanied him to almost all official events outside of Urbino. She acted as regent during her husband's absences from Urbino.

Carrying on the Sforza family's tradition of humanist education for women, she educated her daughters similarly to the education she had received from her aunt Bianca Maria. Similarly, Battista's granddaughter Vittoria Colonna, daughter of Agnese, was a famous poet.

After giving birth to six daughters, Battista gave birth to their first son and heir Guidobaldo da Montefeltro on 24 January 1472. However, three months after the birth of their son, Battista, having never fully recovered from her last pregnancy and labour, fell ill and died in July 1472.

See also 
 Diptych of Federico da Montefeltro and Battista Sforza

References

Further reading

External links

The Gubbio Studiolo and its conservation, volumes 1 & 2, from The Metropolitan Museum of Art Libraries (fully available online as PDF), which contains material on Battista Sforza (see index)

House of Sforza
15th-century Italian women
1446 births
1472 deaths
Duchesses of Urbino
15th-century women rulers